The 1970 Houston Astros season was a season in American baseball. The team finished fourth in the National League West with a record of 79–83, 23 games behind the Cincinnati Reds.

Offseason 
 November 21, 1969: Mike Marshall was purchased by the Astros from the Milwaukee Brewers.
 December 4, 1969: Curt Blefary was traded by the Astros to the New York Yankees for Joe Pepitone.

Regular season

Season standings

Record vs. opponents

Notable transactions 
 June 4, 1970: Greg Gross was drafted by the Astros in the 4th round of the 1970 Major League Baseball draft. Player signed June 9, 1970.
 June 23, 1970: Mike Marshall was traded by the Astros to the Montreal Expos for Don Bosch.
 July 29, 1970: Joe Pepitone was purchased from the Astros by the Chicago Cubs.
 August 12, 1970: Jim Bouton was released by the Houston Astros.

Roster

Player stats

Batting

Starters by position 
Note: Pos = Position; G = Games played; AB = At bats; H = Hits; Avg. = Batting average; HR = Home runs; RBI = Runs batted in

Other batters 
Note: G = Games played; AB = At bats; H = Hits; Avg. = Batting average; HR = Home runs; RBI = Runs batted in

Pitching

Starting pitchers 
Note: G = Games pitched; IP = Innings pitched; W = Wins; L = Losses; ERA = Earned run average; SO = Strikeouts

Other pitchers 
Note: G = Games pitched; IP = Innings pitched; W = Wins; L = Losses; ERA = Earned run average; SO = Strikeouts

Relief pitchers 
Note: G = Games pitched; W = Wins; L = Losses; SV = Saves; ERA = Earned run average; SO = Strikeouts

Farm system 

LEAGUE CHAMPIONS: Columbus

References

External links
1970 Houston Astros season at Baseball Reference

Houston Astros seasons
Houston Astros season
Houston Astro